Muntik Nang Maabot ang Langit is a 1995 Philippine drama film directed by Manuel "Fyke" Cinco. The film stars Jennifer Mendoza in her first leading role, along with Tonton Gutierrez and Patrick Guzman. It is named after True Faith's hit song.

Cast
 Jennifer Mendoza as Jenny
 Nicole Anderson as Young Jenny
 Tonton Gutierrez as Ben
 Beneth Ignacio as Young Ben
 Patrick Guzman as Brando
 Charito Solis as Doña Josefa Aquino
 Jean Saburit as Aling Luming
 Shirley Fuentes as Linda
 Brando Legaspi as Gardo
 True Faith as Themselves
 Marco Polo Garcia as Mario
 Lucita Soriano as Linda's Mother

References

External links

1995 films
Filipino-language films
Philippine drama films
OctoArts Films films
Films directed by Manuel Cinco